This is a list of the Romania national under-21 football team results from 1977 to 1979.

Results

1977

1978

1979

References

All details are sourced to the match reports cited, unless otherwise specified:

External links
Romanian Football Federation
 Romania Under-21 FRF.ro

F